The 20th century BC was a century that lasted from the year 2000 BC to 1901 BC.

The period of the 2nd Millennium BC

Events

 c. 2000 BC:
 Farmers and herders traveled south from Ethiopia and settled in Kenya.
 Dawn of the Capacha Culture in modern-day Colima, Mexico.
 Humans settle in Matanchén, modern day Nayarit, Mexico
 Arrival of the ancestors of the Latins in Italy.
 Town of Mantua was founded.
 First of the Minoan palaces on Crete. Site of palace complex Knossos started to become occupied.
 Bronze Age began in north Ancient China.
 Middle Jōmon period ended in Japan.
 Decline of Harappan civilization began.
 The Harappa Torso was sculpted by a member of the Indus Valley culture.
 Vessel, from Asahi Mound, Toyama Prefecture, was made. Jōmon period. It is now kept at Collection of Tokyo University.
 Dogū, from Kurokoma, Yamanashi Prefecture, was made. Jōmon period. It is now kept at Tokyo National Museum.
 Stonehenge construction largely completed.
 Dawn of the Lal-lo and Gattaran Shell Middens pilings in the Philippines.
 Horses were tamed and used for transport.
 The last woolly mammoth goes extinct on Wrangel island.
 c. 2000 BC – 1900 BC: the "Priest-king torso" was sculpted at Mohenjo-Daro, part of the Indus Valley civilization.
 c. 1995 BC: Pharaoh Mentuhotep II, Eleventh dynasty of Egypt dies.
 c. 1995 BC: Egypt: Pharaoh Mentuhotep IV died. End of Eleventh Dynasty. Pharaoh Amenemhat I started to rule. Start of Twelfth Dynasty.
 c. 1985 BC: Political authority became less centralized in Ancient Egypt.
 c. 1985 BC – 1795 BC: 
 Rock-cut tombs at Beni Hasan were made. Twelfth Dynasty.
 "Hippopotamus", from the tomb of Senbi (governor) (Tomb B.3) at Meir was made. Twelfth Dynasty. It is now in the Metropolitan Museum of Art, New York.
1974 BC: Erishum I became the thirty-third ruler of Assyria.
February 27, 1953 BC: A very close alignment of the naked-eye planets took place in which these planets are together in a span of 4.3 degrees.
March 5, 1953 BC: A computer calculated alignment of the naked-eye planets took place in a new moon, and in spring season, and is believed by researchers from NASA,  to be the starting event for the Chinese calendar, as they followed descriptions from a 1st Century B.C. Chinese passage "Hong Fan Zhuan" by 'Liu Xiang', to search for this astronomical event being described to have happened about 2000 BC at Pegasus constellation (Yingshi).
c. 1942 BC: The so-called king of Leubingen (today part of Sömmerda) was buried in a large barrow within a  stone cairn inside a ring ditch.
1932 BC: Amorite conquest of Ur.
c. 1928 BC – 1895 BC: "Harvest scene", tempera facsimile by Nina de Garis Davies of wall painting in the tomb of Khnumhotep II, Beni Hasan. Twelfth Dynasty.
c. 1920 BC: Jishi Gorge flood. It may have sparked the beginning of the first Chinese dynasty (Xia, Erlitou culture) 
1913 BC – 1903 BC: Egyptian-Nubian war.
c. 1900 BC: Shalim-ahum and his son Ilu-shuma began to rule the city of Assur at around this time.

Inventions, discoveries, introductions
 c. 2000 BC: Glass appears.
 2000 BC: In the Old Assyrian Empire, the Sumerian cuneiform had evolved into Old Assyrian cuneiform, with many modifications to Sumerian orthography. 
 1950 BC: The copper bar cubit of Nippur defines the Sumerian cubit (approximately 51.72 cm).
 c. 1900 BC: Cacao is domesticated by the Mokaya in Guatemala.

Sovereign states

References

 
-0
-80